James Swallow (1878 – 17 November 1916) was a Cape Colony cricketer. He played in three first-class matches for Border from 1906/07 to 1908/09. He was killed in action during World War I.

See also
 List of Border representative cricketers

References

External links
 

1878 births
1916 deaths
Cricketers from Cape Colony
Border cricketers
People from Uitenhage
South African military personnel killed in World War I